Harlakhi Assembly constituency is an assembly constituency in Madhubani district in the Indian state of Bihar.

Overview
As per Delimitation of Parliamentary and Assembly constituencies Order, 2008, No. 31. Harlakhi Assembly constituency is composed of the following: Harlakhi and Madhwapur community development blocks; Karhara, Samada, Salha, Teoth, Mahamadpur, Betauna and Manpaur gram panchayats of Benipatti CD Block.

Harlakhi Assembly constituency is part of No. 6. Madhubani (Lok Sabha constituency).

Members of Legislative Assembly

Election results

2020

Bypoll 2016

2015

1977-2010
In the November 2010 state assembly elections, Aditya Thakur of JD(U) won the Harlakhi assembly seat defeating his nearest rival Rishi Kumar Rai of CPI. Contests in most years were multi cornered but only winners and runners are being mentioned. Rishi Kumar Rai of CPI defeated Anuj Kumar of RJD in October 2005 and February 2005. Anuj Kumar of RJD defeated Rishi Kumar Rai of CPI in 2000. Rishi Kumar Rai of CPI defeated Vanya Yadav of Congress in 1995. Vanya Yadav of Congress defeated Rishi Kumar Rai of CPI in 1990. Bhuneshwar Jha of Congress defeated Vipul Borraha of CPI in 1985 and 1980. Pandey of CPI defeated sarpanch  of Congress in 1977.

References

External links
 

Assembly constituencies of Bihar
Politics of Madhubani district